KIIT School of Management (KSOM) is a premier business school located in Bhubaneswar, Odisha, India. It was established in 1993 as the Institute of Business Administration and Training. It is a constituent institute of Kalinga Institute of Industrial Technology.

KIIT School of Management is one of the 10 private institutes in India and the only one in Odisha to get "Institution of Eminence" tag from UGC, MHRD, Govt. of India.

The institute was accredited by National Assessment and Accreditation Council in 'A' grade. It offers the two-year flagship Master of Business Administration (MBA) program along with a Bachelor of Business Administration (BBA) and a doctoral program in Management. The institute also regularly conducts Management Development programs for working executives.
 
The institute conducts its own national-level entrance examination called KIITEE Management generally held in January each year. It also accepts CAT, GMAT, CMAT, MAT and ATMA scores for admission.

History

The school was founded in 1993 as Institute of Business Administration and Training by Pradyumna Kishore Bal, an eminent thinker and pioneer of value-based journalism. The institute started a two year post-graduate diploma in Management with an annual intake of 60 students in a rented building in Nayapalli, Bhubaneswar, which were revised to 120 seats in the year 2002. Later on in 2004, it was affiliated to Kalinga Institute of Industrial Technology.

The successive directors of KSOM were Arindam Banerjee, M.L. Monga, Ramesh Chandra Pani, D.V. Ramana, Govind Rajan, H.R. Machiraju, L.K. Vaswani and Deepak Gandhi, Anil Bajpai and Debasis Das. , Prof. Anil Bajpai is the director and Prof. Satya Narayan Misra the current dean.

Campus
The school is a fully WIFI campus spread across 35 acres.

Classroom – 
All the class rooms are equipped with audio-video systems, overhead projectors, computers and wireless hotspots.

Auditorium – 
It has a 500-seater in-house auditorium for industry talks, student functions, lectures and movie screening. 

Amphitheatre – 
It also has one 120-seater open gallery for seminar talks and smaller events.

Hostel – 
There are separate boys and girls hostels for all inmates, across all programs. All the rooms are Wi-Fi enabled.

Sports – 
Swimming Pools, Tennis and Volleyball Courts, Large Playgrounds, a jogging track and facilities for indoor sports, for students and faculty are provided as part of the University. The school also houses a 24/7 multipurpose gymnasium.

Medical Facility – 
Kalinga Institute of Industrial Technology has its own ultra-modern multi-specialty thousand-bed hospital – Kalinga Institute of Medical Sciences, that provides medical checkups to the students every year. The students are covered under the University medical insurance policy.

Academics

Academic programmes
Master of Business Administration (MBA): Two-year full-time residential programme with specializations in Business Analytics, Marketing, Finance, Human Resource Management, Technology and Operations Management (TOM) and Information Technology (IT), is the flagship programme of KSOM.
Bachelor of Business Administration (BBA): The three-year program at KSOM provides the basics of business and the fundamentals of management in a simplified manner. Student studying BBA at KSOM find it easy to continue into MBA, start something on their own or join their own business. 
Ph.D Programme: The doctoral programme at KSOM is designed to promote academic research. Prof Rajen K Gupta, Professor at Management Development Institute (MDI), Gurgaon, as the Research Advisor, looks into all aspects of management research at KSOM. Notable alumni include Debapratim Purkayastha.
Management Development Programmes (MDP): KSOM provides both on site & off site MDPs to both private and public sector enterprises at different levels of the organizational hierarchy.
Faculty Development Programmes (FDP): KSOM assists in the training and development of Faculties (from within the university and outside) and fellow Ph.D scholars alike through its Faculty Development Programs. Various training program are offered to enhance the ability in conducting meaningful research, improving research methodology and functional area experience.

The curriculum is divided into 9 academic areas: Marketing, Business Analytics, Finance and Accounts, Human Resources & Organizational Behaviour, Information Technology, Production & Operations Management, General Management, Business Communication, Strategy, Managerial Economics, Quantitative Methods & Decision Sciences and Entrepreneurial Management.

The MBA curriculum consists of three different components – Core courses, Elective courses and corporate experience through study tours and Summer Internship Program (SIP).The core and elective courses are delivered over 4 semesters of 20 weeks' duration for each semester and a summer project of 8 weeks' duration after the 2nd semester in the months of May & June (SIP). There are 17 core courses in the first year and one core course plus elective courses equivalent to 32 credits in the second year covering seven functional areas.

Summer internship
Students at the school take up two-month Summer Internship Program (SIP) after their second semester. The internship comprises 8 credits, forming a significant part of students’ overall academic credits. The students work on projects that help them familiarize with the corporate culture and the demands of today's business.

Accreditation

 KSOM, KIIT Deemed to be University, is one of the 10 private institutes in India and the only one in Odisha to get ‘Institution of Eminence’ tag from UGC, MHRD, Govt. of India.
 KIIT has been awarded NAAC Accreditation in “A” grade.
 The MBA program of KIIT School of Management is approved by All India Council of Technical Education (AICTE), Government of India. Besides, the MBA program is accredited by the National Board of Accreditation (NBA) of AICTE .
 KIIT has the distinction of being the youngest institute ever in the country to be declared a University (U/S 3 of UGC Act, 1956)by the Ministry of Human Resource Development, Government of India.
 KSOM has been awarded Life Membership by Association of Management Development Institutions in South Asia (AMDISA).
 Ministry of Human Resource Development (MHRD), Govt. of India has placed Kalinga Institute of Industrial Technology in the list of Category ‘A’ Deemed Universities on the basis of Tandon Committee recommendations.
 KSOM bagged the 'Best B School of Odisha' award at the Times Business Awards Bhubaneswar 2020.

Rankings

KIIT was ranked 31 amongst management schools in India by the National Institutional Ranking Framework (NIRF) in 2021 and 11 in India by Outlook Indias "Top 150 Private MBA Institutions" of 2020.

Library 
The 9,800 sq.ft. library housed inside the campus is well equipped with computer terminals with high speed broadband Ethernet access coupled with fast wireless access. It has been automated using (LibSys 7) with online catalogue (webopac).

It has a collection of printed and electronic resources which includes over 22,122 books, 30 international and 150 national journals, over 10,000 e-journals made available through various online databases EBSCO, Emerald and ABI/INFORM Complete and CMIE (Corporate database) on Management Development studies and related subjects.

Faculty
The school has over 60 full-time faculty members with qualifications from institutions including University of Massachusetts, University of Wisconsin, IIM Ahmedabad, IIM Lucknow, IIM Kozhikode, XLRI, XIMB, IITs. Close to 50% of the faculty hold doctoral degrees with many others pursuing doctoral studies.

The permanent faculty team is supplemented by several visiting faculties, drawn from both industry and academia.

Parikalpana

KSOM publishes a bi-annual peer reviewed journal named Parikalpana which includes articles submitted by faculty members, research scholars and professionals. The journal covers business sectors in India and abroad.

Collaborations
KSOM has established academic partnership with several organisations to jointly deliver content, foster innovation, enhance student learning and develop new capabilities. 
 Dassault Systemes (DS) – A Center for Building Competence in Product Lifecycle Management has been established under the partnership with Dassault Systemes to focus on building manpower for managing the engineering and technological needs of the Indian industry.
 SAP University Alliances – KSOM has entered into an alliance with SAP University Alliance Program to provide SAP education to MBA students.
 SHRM India – KSOM recently signed an MoU with SHRM India to accelerate the overall development of all MBA Students through 100 hours of engagement in small groups as well as in one-to-one interaction with broad range of experienced experts from the industry for onc complete year. The engagements would broadly cover development of general management skills; development of functional skills; and development of soft skills
 Tech Mahindra – KSOM recently signed an MoU with Tech Mahindra to conceptualize research projects, share information and technology to develop required skills and execute projects
 NHRD – KSOM has association with NHRD (National Human Resource Development Network) for event partnership & conclaves in HR area.

Student life

Clubs
Beyond the classroom study hours, students learn the nuances of management through clubs, both academic and non-academic, and special interest groups. Students can join one or more of the 10 clubs on campus. The club work involves group-task, leadership skills, creativity, time and conflict management and general sociality. The clubs invite speakers to campus, organize trips, social events, and help form bonds between students of similar interests.

The Student Development Committee is the main interface between the MBA student body and the faculty/administration.

Clubs further hones their management skills by organizing events related to the various aspects of management. The clubs bring together group-work, leadership skills, creativity, hard work, management principles and general camaraderie in an entertaining way. Each club has members from both First and Second Year MBA students and is led by a faculty coordinator.

Following are the various student clubs operating at the institute:

 Synergy  – HR Club
 Matricks – Marketing Club 
 Sanskriti – Cultural Club 
 Aequitas – Sports Club 
 Exchequer – Finance Club 
 Opsession – Technology and Operations Club 
 FirstCut – Media Club
 Renaissance – Entrepreneurship Club
 Reminiscence – Alumni Club
 KAPS – Advertising Club

Social concern
 Blood 24×7 – Students of KSOM, under a society called "Blood 24×7" have several times organized Blood Donation camps and spread the awareness about donating blood. They have donned T-shirts with blood donation messages, staged street shows and approached local people urging them to consider donating blood.
 Share a Smile – KSOM students have several times collected used clothes, blankets, stationery from the campus and donated them to needy staying around the campus.
 National Service Scheme (NSS) – KSOM NSS wing was started during the Youth Week of 12–19 January 2011 to usher the students on a path of social service and community development activities.

Events
Business and cultural events are organised by the student community of KSOM.

Kolosseum is the annual b-school fest of KSOM. Spread over three days, the event witnesses various management, cultural and creative games and star performances. It has included appearances from Sona Mohapatra, Ram Sampath, Kunal Ganjawala, Hard Kaur, Krishna Beura, KK and others.

HR Conclave: Each year, a relevant HR issue is picked up by the Human Resources area that forms the underlying theme of the conclave at KSOM. Students get a ringside view of the latest in the field of HR and gets to live the experiences of the senior industry professionals though panel discussions, keynote speeches, student workshops, etc. Key speakers of the past HR Conclaves include Mr. Rajeev Dubey,  Mr. S.Y Siddiqui, Mr. Ambarish Dasgupta, Dr. Sumit Chowdhury, etc.

Finance Conclave: KSOM organizes a national level Finance Conclave each year. Key attendees of past Finance conclaves have been Dr. Aditya Puri, MD and CEO, HDFC Bank; Dr. N. Chandrasekaran, MD and CEO, TCS; Dr. K C Chakrabarty, Deputy Governor, RBI; Dr. K G Karmakar, MD, NABARD; Mr. Debashish Mohanty, Country Head, UTI MF; Mr. Tridev Khandelwal, Associate Director, SR Batliboi & Associates, etc.

Marketing Conclave: Each year, the school organizes a National Level Marketing Conclave, with a theme based on New Trends and Challenges in Marketing.Some of the guests of past Marketing Conclaves have been Mr. Dilip Cherian, PR Consultant, widely considered the “Image Guru” of India; Mr.Vishnu Govind, GM-Marketing; Raymond Limited; Mr. Videh Jaipuriar, CEO – Jubilant Industries Limited; Mr. Salil K. Sahu, MD – Home Stores India, etc.

National Management Convention: It's a yearly event where both Academic and Corporate Delegates present their research findings. The prominent speakers of Past conventions include Ms. Shobha Mishra Ghosh, Senior Director, Education, FICCI and Shri Debabrat Mishra, Director, Hay Group; Prof. C. V. Baxi, Professor in Public Policy and Governance, MDI Gurgaon & Mr. Nikhil Pant, Chief Programme Officer, NFCSR, IICA; Mr. Praveen Gupta, Chief General Manager, SBI and Prof. B.B. Bhattacharya, Former Vice Chancellor, JNU and Distinguished Professor, IIM Lucknow

See also
 List of business schools in India

References

External links
 Official website of KSOM

Business schools in Odisha
Universities and colleges in Bhubaneswar
Educational institutions established in 1993
Kalinga Institute of Industrial Technology
1993 establishments in Orissa